The 2000–01 Toto Cup Al was the 17th season of the third most important football tournament in Israel since its introduction. This was the second edition to be played with clubs of both Israeli Permier League and Liga Leumit clubs.

The competition began on 4 August 2000 and ended on 23 January 2001, with Hapoel Haifa beating Beitar Jerusalem 1–0 in the final.

Results

First round

|}

Second round

|}

Quarter-finals

Semifinals

Final

See also
 2000–01 Toto Cup Artzit

References

External links
 Israel Cups 2000/01 RSSSF
 Toto Cup 2000–2001 Season Israeli Football 
 Toto Cup 00-01 One.co.il 

Al
Toto Cup Al
Toto Cup Al